East Herkimer is a hamlet and census-designated place (CDP) in the town of Herkimer in Herkimer County, New York, United States. It was first listed as a CDP prior to the 2020 census.

The community is in south-central Herkimer County, in the southeast part of the town of Herkimer. It is bordered to the west, across West Canada Creek, by the village of Herkimer. The hamlet sits on a bluff overlooking the Mohawk River to the south.

New York State Route 5 runs through the center of the hamlet, leading west into Herkimer village and east  to Little Falls.

Demographics

References 

Census-designated places in Herkimer County, New York
Census-designated places in New York (state)